Erín Moure (born 1955 in Calgary, Alberta) Erín Moure is a Canadian poet and translator with 18 books of poetry, a coauthored book of poetry, a volume of essays, a book of articles on translation, a poetics, and two memoirs; she has translated or co-translated 21 books of poetry and two of biopoetics from French, Spanish, Galician, Portuguese, and Ukrainian, by poets such as Nicole Brossard (with Robert Majzels), Andrés Ajens, Chantal Neveu, Rosalía de Castro, Chus Pato, Uxío Novoneyra, Lupe Gómez (with Rebeca Lema Martínez and on her own), Fernando Pessoa, and Yuri Izdryk (with Roman Ivashkiv). Three of her own books have appeared in translation, one each in German, Galician, and French. Her work has received the Governor General’s Award twice, Pat Lowther Memorial Award, A. M. Klein Prize twice, and has been a three-time finalist for the Griffin Prize and three-time finalist in the USA for a Best Translated Book Award (Poetry). Her latest is The Elements (2019) and Theophylline: an a-poretic migration will appear in 2023. Her work is rooted in a philosophical mix that accepts mystery, not always immediately accessible, and she has won several prizes, including the Governor General's Award twice.

Early and personal life

Her mother was born 1924 in what is today western Ukraine, and emigrated to Canada in 1929.<ref>The Unmemntionable, Erín Mouré. Anansi: 2015, p. 117</ref> Her father, born in Ottawa, Ontario in 1925 was a great-grandson of the painter George Théodore Berthon.  Erín Moure is the oldest of three, having two younger brothers.

In 1975, Moure moved to Vancouver, British Columbia, where she took her second year classes at University of British Columbia in philosophy. After only taking one year of classes she left University of British Columbia and got a job at Via Rail Canada where she continued to write poetry. This is where she learned French. She learned Galician in the early 21st century in order to translate the poetry of Chus Pato. She also translates from Portuguese, Spanish and English.

She lives in Montreal, Quebec.

 Writing and style 
According to an interview conducted in the early 1990s, Moure has four major influences which led her to become a writer, other than the work of other writers or poets: "Landscape of cars, her mother going to work, her mother teaching her to read, and in a small way losing her sense of touch".

Many years ago, Melissa Jacques wrote, "Erin Moure's poetry is fragmented, meta-critical and explicitly deconstructive. Folding everyday events and ordinary people into complex and often irresolvable philosophical dilemmas, Moure challenges the standards of accessibility and common sense. Not surprisingly, her work has met with a mixed response. Critics are often troubled by the difficult and therefore alienating nature of the writing; even amongst Moure's advocates, the issues of accessibility and political efficacy are recurrent themes."

Moure has been nominated for, and has won, many writing awards for her writing and her translation.  These include the Pat Lowther Memorial Award, the Governor General's Award for poetry, the A. M. Klein Prize for Poetry, the Best Translated Book Award for poetry, and the Nelson Ball Prize.

Her most recent poetry book, The Elements, appeared in 2019.

Awards and honours

1988 Governor General's Award for English-language poetry for the volume Furious.2014 Best Translated Book Award, poetry, shortlist for White Piano by Nicole Brossard, from the French
 Griffin Poetry Prize biography
2017 Harvard University 2017 WPR Creative fellowship, RESONANCE: A MODERNISM with Erin Moure
2021 Governor General's Award for French to English translation - This Radiant Life (Chantal Neveu, La vie radieuse)

 Works of poetry 

 Empire, York Street, Toronto: House of Anansi Press, 1979 (nominated for a Governor General's Award)
 The Whisky Vigil, Madeira Park, BC: Harbour Publishing, 1981
 Wanted Alive, Toronto: House of Anansi Press, 1983
 Domestic Fuel, Toronto: House of Anansi Press, 1985 (winner of the Pat Lowther Award)
 Furious, Toronto: House of Anansi Press, 1988 (winner of the 1988 Governor General's Award for poetry)
 WSW, Montreal: Véhicule Press, 1989 (winner of the A. M. Klein Prize for Poetry
 Sheepish Beauty, Civilian Love, Montreal: Véhicule Press, 1992
 The Green Word: Selected Poems: 1973–1992, Toronto: Oxford University Press, 1994
 Search Procedures, Toronto: House of Anansi Press, 1996 (nominated for a Governor General's Award)
 A Frame of the Book, Toronto: House of Anansi Press, 1999
 Pillage Laud, Montreal: Moveable Type Books, 1999
 O Cidadán, Toronto: House of Anansi Press, 2002 (nominated for a Governor General's Award)
 Little Theatres, Toronto: House of Anansi Press, 2005 (winner of the A. M. Klein Prize for Poetry, nominated for a Governor General's Award, nominated for the Pat Lowther Award, shortlisted for the 2006 Canadian Griffin Poetry Prize)
 O Cadoiro, Toronto: House of Anansi Press, 2007
 Expeditions of a Chimæra (collaboration with Oana Avasilichioaei), Toronto: Book*hug Press, 2009  (shortlisted for the 2011 A. M. Klein Prize for Poetry)
 O Resplandor, Toronto: House of Anansi Press, 2010 (shortlisted for the 2011 A. M. Klein Prize for Poetry)
 The Unmemntioable, Toronto: House of Anansi Press, 2012
 Insecession a dual book with Chus Pato's Secession, Toronto: Book*hug Press, 2014
 Kapusta, Toronto: House of Anansi Press, 2015The Elements, Toronto: House of Anansi Press, 2019

 Translations from other languages 
 Installations – 2000, translation with Robert Majzels from French of Nicole Brossard's Installations Sheep's Vigil by a Fervent Person translation from Portuguese of Fernando Pessoa / Alberto Caeiro's O Guardador de Rebanhos- 2001 (shortlisted for the 2002 Canadian Griffin Poetry Prize)
 Museum of Bone and Water – 2003, translation with Robert Majzels from French of Nicole Brossard's Musée de l'os et de l'eau Notebook of Roses and Civilization – 2007, translation with Robert Majzels from French of Nicole Brossard's Cahier de roses & de civilisation (nominated for a Governor General's Award; shortlisted for the 2008 Canadian Griffin Poetry Prize)
 Charenton – 2007, translation from Galician of Chus Pato's Charenton Quase Flanders, Quase Extremadura – 2008, translation from Spanish of excerpts from the poetry of Andrés Ajens
 m-Talá – 2009, translation from Galician of Chus Pato's m-Talá Hordes of Writing – 2011, translation from Galician of Chus Pato's Hordas de escritura Just Like Her – 2011, translation from French of Louise Dupré's Tout come elle White Piano – 2013, translation with Robert Majzels from French of Nicole Brossard's Piano blanc Galician Songs – 2013, translation from Galician of Rosalia de Castro's Cantares Gallegos Secession – 2014, translation from Galician of Chus Pato's Secesión Flesh of Leviathan – 2016, translation from Galician of Chus Pato's Carne de Leviatán New Leaves – 2016, translation from Galician of Rosalia de Castro's Follas Novas My Dinosaur – 2016, translation from French of François Turcot's Mon dinosaureParaguayan Sea – 2017, translated from Portunhol and Guarani to Frenglish and Guarani of Wilson Bueno's Mar paraguayoCamouflage – 2019, translated from Galician of Lupe Gómez's CamuflaxeThe Uplands: Book of the Courel and other poems – 2020, translated from Galician of Uxío Novoneyra's Os Eidos and other poemsThis Radiant Life – 2020, translated from French of Chantal Neveu's La vie radieuseThe Face of the Quartzes – 2021, translated from Galician of Chus Pato's Un libre favor Essays, Letters and Memoirs 
 Two Women Talking: Correspondence 1985–1987 – 1994 (with Bronwen Wallace)
 My Beloved Wager essays – 2009
 Sitting Shiva on Minto Avenue, by Toots, Vancouver: New Star Books, 2017
 A Century in the North Peace: Life and Times of Anne and John Callison'', Montreal: Zat-So Productions, 2018

See also

Canadian literature
Canadian poetry
List of Canadian poets

References

External links
 Archives of Erin Moure (Erin Mouré fonds, R11781) are held at Library and Archives Canada

1955 births
Living people
Canadian women poets
Governor General's Award-winning poets
Canadian LGBT poets
Canadian lesbian writers
University of British Columbia alumni
Writers from Calgary
Writers from Montreal
Writers from Vancouver
20th-century Canadian poets
21st-century Canadian poets
20th-century Canadian women writers
21st-century Canadian women writers
Governor General's Award-winning translators
21st-century Canadian LGBT people
20th-century Canadian LGBT people